Nedra Volz (née Gordonier; June 18, 1908 – January 20, 2003) was an American actress. In television, she portrayed Aunt Iola on All in the Family, Adelaide Brubaker on Diff'rent Strokes, Emma Tisdale on The Dukes of Hazzard, and Winona Beck on Filthy Rich. Her roles in films include appearing as Big Ed in Lust in the Dust (1985), Loretta Houk in Moving Violations (1985), and Lana in Earth Girls Are Easy (1988).

Early life and career
Born in Montrose, Iowa, she began her career in the family tent show, appearing as a toddler (called "Baby Nedra"). The act continued until she was 11 years old and had outgrown the act's title. She unsuccessfully tried acting in high school, which led her to pursue music.

In the early 1930s, Volz was featured vocalist with Cato's Vagabonds, a Des Moines, Iowa, big band that briefly enjoyed national popularity. Cato never made records, but Volz managed to appear on exactly one 78 side, with Will Osborne's orchestra in 1933. In 1932, Volz and two other singers from Cato's orchestra performed as "Nedra, Paul, and Glenn" on WHAM radio in Rochester, New York.

In 1940, Volz, described as a "blues songstress", was part of a vaudeville revue in Miami, Florida.
 
Beginning with an episode of Good Times in 1975, she became a well-recognized supporting character actress, primarily on television and also in feature films. Volz often played grandmothers or feisty little old ladies, in 1970s sitcoms such as Alice, Maude and One Day at a Time, after she appeared in two of Norman Lear's summer television series: as Grandma Belle Durbin in A Year at the Top in 1977 and as Bill Macy's housekeeper Pinky Nolan in Hanging In in 1979. In 1978, Volz appeared in the pilot episode of the TV series WKRP in Cincinnati, where she whacked a turntable with her umbrella in protest of the station's format change, and in All In The Family as Edith's spinster relative and unwelcome visitor, Aunt Iola.

In 1980, she appeared in several Jack in the Box TV spots as they blew up Jack, one of more than 25 commercials that featured Volz.

By 1980 she appeared on TV almost weekly, starting with a recurring role as housekeeper Adelaide Brubaker in the sitcom Diff'rent Strokes. In 1981 she landed another recurring role as postal worker Emma Tisdale on the TV show The Dukes of Hazzard. In the 1982–83 season, Volz was the matriarch on Filthy Rich, a series spoofing prime-time soap operas of the day. Volz's character Winona "Mother B" Beck, was the discarded first wife of cryogenically frozen Big Guy Beck (Slim Pickens and, after his death, Forrest Tucker), constantly trying to escape from the nursing home to return to the family mansion, Toad Hall. Volz's final series role was as the bail-bonds woman that hired Lee Majors' bounty-hunter character on The Fall Guy from 1985 until the series ended in 1986.

In "Mission of Peace", a 1986 episode of The A-Team, she was one of a group of senior citizens forced into asking the team for help. She portrayed the roles of Mrs. Perwinkle and Angelica on The Super Mario Bros. Super Show in 1989. She continued as a guest star on such series as Night Court, Coach, The Commish and Babes into the early 1990s, and she continued to act well into her eighties.

In Moving Violations, director Neil Israel allowed her to do many stunts herself, including being lifted into a window and falling head-first onto the floor. Volz's last acting role was in The Great White Hype in 1996.

Personal life
 
Volz' first husband, Lester Rhode, was a songwriter and director of Cato's Vagabonds orchestra; they later divorced. In 1944 she married Oren Volz. The couple had three children. Oren Volz died in 1987 after 43 years of marriage. 

Volz lived in Upland, California through the 1980s and 1990s. She was a volunteer Official Celebrity Spokesperson for D.A.R.E. in Ontario, California, before she relocated to Mesa, Arizona.

Death
On January 20, 2003, Volz died of complications from Alzheimer's disease in Mesa, Arizona.

Filmography

Film

Television

References

1908 births
2003 deaths
20th-century American actresses
Actresses from Iowa
American film actresses
American television actresses
Neurological disease deaths in Arizona
Deaths from Alzheimer's disease
Vaudeville performers
People from Lee County, Iowa
20th-century American women singers
20th-century American singers
21st-century American women